The 2017 Stetson Hatters football team represented Stetson University during the 2017 NCAA Division I FCS football season. They were led by fifth-year head coach Roger Hughes and played their home games at Spec Martin Stadium. They were members of the Pioneer Football League. They finished the season 2–9, 1–7 in PFL play to finish in tenth place.

Schedule

Source: Schedule

Game summaries

at Sacred Heart

at Marist

Dartmouth

Campbell

at Valparaiso

Brown

Davidson

at Morehead State

San Diego

Butler

at Jacksonville

References

Stetson
Stetson Hatters football seasons
Stetson Hatters football